Tollen is a village located 6 km from Churachandpur and  from Imphal, the capital city of Manipur, India.

The village is divided into two blocks by the Imphal Churachandpur highway. The school building and public playground is located here.

Villages in Churachandpur district